Insulin-like growth factor 2 receptor (IGF2R), also called the cation-independent mannose-6-phosphate receptor (CI-MPR) is a protein that in humans is encoded by the IGF2R gene. IGF2R is a multifunctional protein receptor that binds insulin-like growth factor 2 (IGF2) at the cell surface and mannose-6-phosphate (M6P)-tagged proteins in the trans-Golgi network.

Structure 

The structure of the IGF2R is a type I transmembrane protein (that is, it has a single transmembrane domain with its C-terminus on the cytoplasmic side of lipid membranes) with a large extracellular/lumenal domain and a relatively short cytoplasmic tail. The extracellular domain consists of a small region homologous to the collagen-binding domain of fibronectin and of fifteen repeats of approximately 147 amino acid residues. Each of these repeats is homologous to the 157-residue extracytoplasmic domain of the mannose 6-phosphate receptor. Binding to IGF2 is mediated through one of the repeats, while two different repeats are responsible for binding to mannose-6-phosphate. The IGF2R is approximately 300 kDa in size; it appears to exist and function as a dimer.

Function 

IGF2R functions to clear IGF2 from the cell surface to attenuate signalling, and to transport lysosomal acid hydrolase precursors from the Golgi apparatus to the lysosome. After binding IGF2 at the cell surface, IGF2Rs accumulate in forming clathrin-coated vesicles and are internalized. In the lumen of the trans-Golgi network, the IGF2R binds M6P-tagged cargo. The IGF2Rs (bound to their cargo) are recognized by the GGA family of clathrin adaptor proteins and accumulate in forming clathrin-coated vesicles. IGF2Rs from both the cell surface and the Golgi are trafficked to the early endosome where, in the relatively low pH environment of the endosome, the IGF2Rs release their cargo. The IGF2Rs are recycled back to the Golgi by the retromer complex, again by way of interaction with GGAs and vesicles. The cargo proteins are then trafficked to the lysosome via the late endosome independently of the IGF2Rs.

Interactions 

Insulin-like growth factor 2 receptor has been shown to interact with M6PRBP1.

Evolution 

The insulin-like growth factor 2 receptor function evolved from the cation-independent mannose 6-phosphate receptor and is first seen in Monotremes. The IGF-2 binding site was likely acquired fortuitously with the generation of an exonic splice site enhancer cluster in exon 34, presumably necessitated by several kilobases of repeat element insertions in the preceding intron. A six-fold affinity maturation then followed during therian evolution, coincident with the onset of imprinting and consistent with the theory of parental conflict.

See also
 Cluster of differentiation
 IGF-1 Receptor
 Mannose 6-phosphate receptor

References

Further reading

External links
 

Receptors
Clusters of differentiation